Jersey College for Girls (JCG, Jèrriais: Lé collège jèrriais pour les fil'yes) is a government-run, fee-paying, academically selective secondary school for girls in Saint Saviour, Jersey. It was founded in 1880 in Saint Helier as Jersey Ladies' College. In 1887, the college moved to a purpose-built site on La Poquelaye and in 1999, it moved again to its present site, on Mont Millais, across from Victoria College, the government fee-paying school for boys.

Despite being owned by the States of Jersey, JCG charges tutition fees – of £2,284 per term in the 2022/23 school year.

History

1880-1999 
The situation for the education of girls in Jersey from the mid-19th century lagged behind provision for boys. Victoria College had been opened for boys, on the pattern of English public schools, in 1852. The well-to-do and the élite classes continued to employ governesses or to send their daughters to schools in France or England; other classes relied on the existing elementary schools in Jersey. Jersey people of influence gathered at the Grove Place Wesleyan Chapel in Saint Helier on 28 November 1879 and decided to set up a limited liability company to further a plan to provide a college for girls in Jersey. The then Bailiff of Jersey, Sir Robert Pipon Marett, became patron of the enterprise and an advertisement appeared in the British Press and Jersey Times in June 1880 to announce the forthcoming opening of the new college in September of that year: "It is designed to give to the daughters of residents and others, at an extremely moderate rate, an education of the highest order. Its promoters have long felt there is a pressing need for such an institution in Jersey".

The school was opened in September 1880 as Jersey Ladies' College, located at Adelaide House in Roussel Street, Saint Helier. Girls were put in for Oxford and Cambridge Local Examinations and Matriculation of London University, and those who had studied in France were able to take the Brevet de capacité in Paris. In 1883 3 students achieved distinction in the Matriculation Examination of London University; the first ladies to have matriculated from Jersey.

In 1887, the Ladies' College acquired property at La Pouquelaye, fronting Rouge Bouillon, in Saint Helier. A new building was constructed (architect: Adolphus Curry (1848–1910)), and the school moved to the new site in 1888. This building has been called "one of the most identifiable buildings in the island". After the First World War the school acquired the neighbouring Mont Cantel site for use as a junior school. The school was purchased in 1928 by the Church of England Schools' Trust. The school changed its name to the Jersey College for Girls, and in 1935 was taken over by the States of Jersey. The Germans occupying Jersey during World War II used the school building first as a barracks and then as a naval hospital.

Since the move of the college to a new site, the 1888 building has been used for other educational functions, but has fallen into disrepair; it has now been proposed for residential redevelopment, while maintaining the historical portions of the old building. The Mont Cantel site formerly occupied by the preparatory school was used by the Jersey Schools Instrumental Service and by Janvrin School, a States primary school for a number of years before being abandoned completely.

Move of the College 

With increasing sixth-form collaboration between JCG and Victoria College and a need to provide new facilities, it was decided to move the college to a new site. The end of boarding provision at Victoria College meant that College House, built as a boarding house for Victoria College in 1901 (architect: Edmund Berteau (1861–1935)) and used as the Feldkommandantur by the German occupying forces 1940–1945, was available for redevelopment and re-use by JCG. A new wing was added behind the 1901 building with further facilities built in front on part of College Field. The transformation was  designed by ArchitecturePLB (formerly Plincke, Leaman and Browning). In 1999, Jersey College for Girls moved to the new site.

Students

In its new location, the school now has approximately 712 students.

Notable former pupils

 Florence Baron, barrister and judge
 Zoe Cameron, former Senator of the States of Jersey 
 Adelaide Casely-Hayford, activist for cultural nationalism, educator, short story writer, and feminist
 Helen Chambers, pathologist and cancer expert
 Jenny Hill, journalist
 Nerina Pallot, nominated for British Female Solo Artist at the 2007 BRIT Awards and nominated for an Ivor Novello Award for "Sophia" in the category of 'Best Song' in the same year
 Marguerite Stocker, Governor of HM Prison Askham Grange, Yorkshire
 Jude Terry, first woman to be promoted to rear admiral in the Royal Navy

See also

 List of schools in Jersey
 Victoria College, Jersey

References

External links
 
 

Schools in Jersey
Secondary schools in the Channel Islands
Saint Saviour, Jersey
Girls' schools in Jersey